Jalan Serkam Pantai (Malacca state route M108) are a set of major roads in Malacca, Malaysia

List of junctions

Roads in Malacca